Eucalyptus tumida is a species of mallee that is endemic to the south coast of Western Australia. It has smooth bark, lance-shaped adult leaves, flower buds in groups of eleven to fifteen, white to pale yellow flowers and cylindrical fruit.

Description
It has smooth brown and grey bark. Flowering occurs from September to February and the flowers are creamy white to pale yellow.

Taxonomy and naming
Eucalyptus tumida was first formally described in 1991 by Ian Brooker and Stephen Hopper in the journal Nuytsia from specimens collected by Brooker in 1983, north-east of Esperance. The specific epithet (tumida) is from the Latin word tumidus meaning "swollen", referring to the flowering buds, the largest in the series Levispermae to which it belongs.

Distribution and habitat
This mallee is found on flats and rises between in near-coastal areas between Ravensthorpe, Israelite Bay and Salmon Gums, where it grows in calcareous sandy-clay-loam soils.

Conservation status
This eucalypt is classified as "not threatened" by the Western Australian Government Department of Parks and Wildlife.

See also
List of Eucalyptus species

References

Eucalypts of Western Australia
tumida
Myrtales of Australia
Plants described in 1991
Mallees (habit)
Taxa named by Ian Brooker
Taxa named by Stephen Hopper